The SS Yoshida Maru No. 1 was a Japanese  cargo ship owned by Yamashita Kisen K. K. The ship was built in 1919 by Asano Shipbuilding Company, at Tsurumi-ku, Yokohama, and sank on 26 April 1944 with great loss of life.

History 
The Yoshida Maru No. 1  was built at Tsurumi-ku, Yokohama in 1919. She was the first ship of her class of 25 standard cargo ships (referred to as Type B at the time) built by Asano Shipyard (one was built at the Uraga Dock Company) between 1918 and 1919.

World War II
Yoshida Maru No. 1 was requisitioned as a transport ship by the Imperial Japanese Navy.

In April 1944, she departed Shanghai as part of the Take Ichi convoy carrying a full Japanese regiment of the 32nd Infantry Division. On April 26, 1944 she was spotted and sunk by the submarine USS Jack.  There were no survivors from the 2,586 soldiers, 81 ship's crew, and 2 armed guards aboard at the time of sinking.

See also

 List by death toll of ships sunk by submarines

Notes

References
 Blair, Clay. (2001).  Silent Victory: The U.S. Submarine War Against Japan. Annapolis, Maryland: Naval Institute Press. ; 
 David L Williams (2012). In the Shadow of the Titanic: Merchant Ships Lost With Greater Fatalities The History Press

1919 ships
Steamships of Japan
World War II merchant ships of Japan
Auxiliary ships of the Imperial Japanese Navy
Ships sunk by American submarines
World War II shipwrecks in the Pacific Ocean
Maritime incidents in April 1944
Yoshida Maru No 1-class cargo ships